Satu Repo is a Canadian writer, educator, and sociology professor.

Biography
Satu Repo is of Finnish-Canadian descent. She is the niece of Finnish journalist Eino S. Repo. Repo and George Martell raised three daughters: Identical twins Marya and Sylvia Duckworth and actress Liisa Repo-Martell, an award-winning Canadian actress.

In 1966 Repo, Martell, and Bob Davis founded "This Magazine Is About Schools".
In its initial years, the magazine's articles were devoted to both education and politics.  After several years the magazine changed its name to simply "This Magazine", and changed its focus to politics alone.
It has been called "The most important source of early writing on Canadian alternative education."

In 1971, Repo edited a 457-page anthology of articles from the magazines first four years.

Repo and George Martell were among the founders of Everdale, a rural, residential "free school".

Works

References

Canadian women non-fiction writers
Canadian non-fiction writers
Living people
Canadian people of Finnish descent
Year of birth missing (living people)